Arnie Hamilton is a Canadian former politician, who served as a BC Liberal Member of the Legislative Assembly of British Columbia from 2001 to 2005, representing the riding of Esquimalt-Metchosin.

Electoral results

External links
Arnie Hamilton

British Columbia Liberal Party MLAs
1948 births
People from North Bay, Ontario
Living people
People from Esquimalt, British Columbia
21st-century Canadian politicians